Albert Celades López (born 29 September 1975) is a Spanish former footballer who played as a defensive midfielder, currently a manager.

A tactically astute player with a strong defensive mentality, he was best known for his stints with Barcelona and Real Madrid, and he amassed La Liga total of 223 matches and eight goals over 12 seasons, totalling ten major titles with the clubs.

Celades appeared with the Spain national team at the 1998 World Cup.

Playing career

Club
Born in Barcelona, Catalonia, Celades – who left Barcelona at age seven with his family to live in Andorra– was a product of FC Barcelona's youth system. He made his debut with the main squad during 1995–96, and finished his first professional season with 16 games and two goals as the Catalans finished third in La Liga. Nevertheless, he would still spend another full campaign with the reserves.

Celades played 36 matches in 1997–98, mostly as a sweeper, as the Louis van Gaal-led team conquered the national title after a three-year drought. He also started both legs of the 1997 UEFA Super Cup, helping to a 3–1 aggregate victory over Borussia Dortmund, but appeared less significantly in the following season, with Barça renewing their domestic supremacy.

After a year with RC Celta de Vigo, Celades moved to Real Madrid, against which he had scored the winner (1–0) in the previous campaign, on 28 November 1999. He featured sparingly over four seasons, but added two league trophies and the 2001–02 UEFA Champions League to his résumé. He also spent 2003–04 on loan to Ligue 1 side FC Girondins de Bordeaux.

From 2005 to 2008, Celades represented Real Zaragoza. In his first year he helped the club reach the Copa del Rey final, and would be relatively used during his tenure as the Aragonese were relegated at the end of 2007–08, and the player was released after his contract expired. In February 2009, he went on trial with the New York Red Bulls in the Major League Soccer and, after impressing, signed in March.

Celades retired from competitive football on 24 October 2009, immediately following the conclusion of the season. In early 2010, however, Kitchee SC from Hong Kong signed him alongside compatriot Agustín Aranzábal; they both appeared with the team at the 2010 Lunar New Year Cup, a mid-season exhibition tournament.

International
Celades played four times for Spain, and was a participant at the 1998 FIFA World Cup with two substitute appearances against Nigeria and Paraguay in an eventual group-stage exit. His debut was on 3 June of that year, in a 4–1 friendly defeat of Northern Ireland in Santander where he started and played the entire game.

Celades' last match consisted of 30 minutes in a 2–1 away victory over Bosnia and Herzegovina for the 2002 World Cup qualifiers. He also represented the non-FIFA Catalonia side, scoring on his debut in a 5–0 defeat of Nigeria on 22 December 1998.

Coaching career
On 7 May 2014, after Julen Lopetegui left for FC Porto, Celades was named manager of the Spanish under-21s after leaving the under-16 team. In October, the former lost their play-off against Serbia for entrance to the 2015 UEFA European Championship, in which they would have been defending champions; the 1–2 second leg loss in Cádiz was their first in 35 games.

On 18 July 2018, Celades resigned from his position at the Royal Spanish Football Federation after five years managing the youth sides, also having acted as assistant to the seniors during the 2014 and 2018 World Cups and UEFA Euro 2016. On 3 August he was appointed as assistant coach of Real Madrid, reuniting with Lopetegui after their period at the Spanish Federation.

On 11 September 2019, Celades became manager of Valencia CF following the dismissal of Marcelino García Toral. His first match in charge took place three days later, in a 5–2 away defeat to his former club Barcelona. The following week, all players refused to accompany him at a press conference ahead of the Champions League fixture against Chelsea, in solidarity with his predecessor.

Celades was relieved of his duties on 29 June 2020, with the team ranked in eighth and six games to go.

Managerial statistics

Honours
Barcelona
La Liga: 1997–98, 1998–99
Copa del Rey: 1996–97, 1997–98
UEFA Cup Winners' Cup: 1996–97
UEFA Super Cup: 1997

Real Madrid
La Liga: 2000–01, 2002–03
Supercopa de España: 2001
UEFA Champions League: 2001–02

Zaragoza
Copa del Rey runner-up: 2005–06

References

External links

1975 births
Living people
Spanish footballers
Footballers from Barcelona
Association football midfielders
Association football utility players
La Liga players
Segunda División players
FC Barcelona Atlètic players
FC Barcelona players
RC Celta de Vigo players
Real Madrid CF players
Real Zaragoza players
Ligue 1 players
FC Girondins de Bordeaux players
Major League Soccer players
New York Red Bulls players
Kitchee SC players
UEFA Champions League winning players
Spain youth international footballers
Spain under-21 international footballers
Spain international footballers
1998 FIFA World Cup players
Catalonia international footballers
Spanish expatriate footballers
Expatriate footballers in France
Expatriate soccer players in the United States
Expatriate footballers in Hong Kong
Spanish expatriate sportspeople in France
Spanish expatriate sportspeople in the United States
Spanish expatriate sportspeople in Hong Kong
Spanish football managers
La Liga managers
Valencia CF managers
Spain national under-21 football team managers